The Gemini Awards were awards given by the Academy of Canadian Cinema & Television between 1986–2011 to recognize the achievements of Canada's television industry. The Gemini Awards are analogous to the Emmy Awards given in the United States and the BAFTA Television Awards in the United Kingdom. First held in 1986 to replace the ACTRA Award, the ceremony celebrated Canadian television productions with awards in 87 categories, along with other special awards such as lifetime achievement awards. The Academy had previously presented the one-off Bijou Awards in 1981, inclusive of some television productions.

In April 2012, the Academy of Canadian Cinema & Television announced that the Gemini Awards and the Genie Awards would be discontinued and replaced by a new award ceremony dedicated to all forms of Canadian media, including television, film, and digital media, dubbed the "Canadian Screen Awards". The first annual Canadian Screen Awards were held on 4 March 2013. 

The Geminis covered only English-language productions. The Academy also organizes a separate awards show for French productions known as the Prix Gémeaux.

Award categories

 Best Music Video

Special awards
 Academy Achievement Award - general lifetime honour, inaugurated in 1996
 Donald Brittain Award - for the best political or social documentary
  Canada Award - began in 1988 as the Multiculturalism Award, this is award "honours excellence in mainstream television programming that reflects the racial and cultural diversity of Canada."
 Margaret Collier Award - lifetime writing honour
 John Drainie Award - broadcasting, not necessarily awarded every year
 Humanitarian Award - inaugurated in 2001, recipients to date:
 (2001) Donald Martin
 (2002) Wendy Crewson
 (2003) Max Keeping
 (2004) George R. Robertson
 (2005) Royal Canadian Air Farce
 Gordon Sinclair Award for Broadcast Journalism - for television journalists who make outstanding contributions

Dates and locations

See also

 Canadian television awards

References

External links
 Official website (archived): 
 

 
1986 establishments in Canada
2011 disestablishments in Canada
Canadian television awards
Awards established in 1986
Awards disestablished in 2011